Arturo Gramajo (30 April 1897 – 4 December 1957) was an Argentine bobsledder. He competed in the four-man event at the 1928 Winter Olympics.

References

External links
 

1897 births
1957 deaths
Argentine male bobsledders
Olympic bobsledders of Argentina
Bobsledders at the 1928 Winter Olympics
Sportspeople from Buenos Aires